Abhydrolase domain-containing protein 2 is a serine hydrolase enzyme that is strongly expressed in human spermatozoa.  It is a key controller of sperm hyperactivation, which is a necessary step in allowing sperm to fertilize an egg. It is encoded by the ABHD2 gene.

Function 
In the presence of Progesterone (or Pregnenolone Sulfate,) it cleaves 2-arachidonoylglycerol (2AG) into glycerol and arachidonic acid (AA).  2AG inhibits sperm calcium channel CatSper, and so when ABHD2 removes 2AG calcium flows into the cell through the CatSper channel, leading to hyperactivation.

ABHD2 is inhibited by testosterone, (as well as hydrocortisone, and the plant triterpenoids lupeol and pristimerin) which may prevent premature hyperactivation.

Structure 

This gene encodes a protein containing an alpha/beta hydrolase fold, which is a catalytic domain found in a very wide range of enzymes.  Alternative splicing of this gene results in two transcript variants encoding the same protein.

Role in disease

The ABHD2 gene is down regulated in the lungs of people with Emphysema. Analysis of ABHD2 deficiency in mice found a decrease in phosphatidylcholine levels.  The mice developed emphysema which was attributed to an increase in macrophage infiltration, increased inflammatory cytokine levels, an imbalance of protease/anti-protease, and an increase in cell death. This research suggests that ABHD2 is important in maintaining the structural integrity of the lungs, and that disruption of phospholipid metabolism in the alveoli may lead to the development of emphysema. Increased expression has also been seen in the lungs of smokers.

ABHD2 is also expressed in atherosclerotic lesions. Expression has been found to be higher in patients with unstable angina than in patients with stable angina.

Up-regulation of ABHD2 has been observed in cells transfected with Hepatitis B virus (HBV) DNA (HepG2.2.15 cells). Expression was down-regulated by the drug lamivudine, used in the treatment of hepatitis B. It has been suggested that ABHD2 has an important role in HBV propagation and could be a potential drug target in the treatment of hepatitis B.

Suppression of ABHD2 has been linked to poor prognoses in ovarian cancer and resistance to platinum-based chemotherapy drugs.

References

External links

Further reading 

 
 
 
 
 
 

Enzymes
Enzymes of unknown structure
Hydrolases
Membrane proteins
Genes on human chromosome 15